Velupillai Ambalavanar Kandiah (3 September 1891 – 4 June 1963) was a Ceylon Tamil lawyer, politician and Member of Parliament.

Early life and family
Kandiah was born on 3 September 1891. He was from the island of Velanaitivu in northern Ceylon. He was educated at Jaffna Hindu College and St. Joseph's College, Colombo. After school Kandiah joined the Ceylon University College, graduating in 1922 with a B.Sc. degree.

Kandiah married and had two sons and three daughters.

Career
Kandiah taught science at St. Joseph's College, Colombo for about eight years before joining the legal profession and becoming an advocate. He practised law in Colombo.

Kandiah stood as a candidate in Colombo Central at the 1947 parliamentary election but was unsuccessful. He was the Illankai Tamil Arasu Kachchi (Federal Party)'s candidate in Kayts at the 1956 parliamentary election. He won the election and entered Parliament. He was re-elected at the March 1960 and July 1960 parliamentary elections.

Following the 1958 riots ITAK and the Jathika Vimukthi Peramuna (National Liberation Front) were banned. ITAK's leaders, including Kandiah, were arrested on 4 June 1958 as they left Parliament and imprisoned.

Kandiah played a leading role in the 1961 satyagraha campaign organised by ITAK. Early on the morning of 20 February 1961 a group of 55 to 75 persons staged a satyagraha at the Jaffna Kachcheri in Old Park. Among them were ITAK MPs A. Amirthalingam, S. J. V. Chelvanayakam, V. Dharmalingam, Kandiah, E. M. V. Naganathan, V. N. Navaratnam and K. Thurairatnam. A large group of policemen arrived in riot gear, wearing helmets and carrying batons and shields. The police started removing the protesters by lifting and carrying them away. Those who resisted were dragged away. Later, as Government Agent M. Srikantha and Superintendent of Police Richard Arndt tried to leave Old Park in a jeep the protesters blocked their way. The police reacted with brutality, beating he protesters with batons and pulled them out bodily. Palaniyappan, a young man who had thrown himself in front of the jeep was pulled away by the police and beaten severely with batons. Five ITAK MPs were amongst the protesters blocking the jeep. Kandiah was carried out and dumped on the ground, Dharmalingam and Thurairatnam were dragged out by their hands and legs whilst Amirthalingam and Naganathan were baton charged. The police also baton charged a crowd of around 5,000 who had gathered to watch the satyagraha.

Kandiah was a founding member of the Hindu Educational Society. He died on 4 June 1963.

References

1891 births
1963 deaths
Alumni of Jaffna Hindu College
Alumni of Saint Joseph's College, Colombo
Alumni of the Ceylon University College
Ceylonese advocates
Illankai Tamil Arasu Kachchi politicians
Members of the 3rd Parliament of Ceylon
Members of the 4th Parliament of Ceylon
Members of the 5th Parliament of Ceylon
People from Northern Province, Sri Lanka
People from British Ceylon
Sri Lankan Tamil lawyers
Sri Lankan Tamil politicians
Sri Lankan Tamil teachers